The Ministry of Defense (Minoboron) was a government ministry in the Soviet Union. The first Minister of Defense was Nikolai Bulganin, starting 1953. The Krasnaya Zvezda (Red Star) was the official newspaper of the Ministry.

The Ministry of Defense was disbanded on 16 March 1992. An agreement to set up a joint CIS military command was signed on 20 March 1992, but the idea was discarded as the post-Soviet states quickly built up separate national armies.

Organization
The Ministry of Defense, an all-union ministry, was technically subordinate to the Council of Ministers, as well as to the Supreme Soviet and the Central Committee of the Communist Party of the Soviet Union. In 1989 it was, however, larger than most other ministries and had special arrangements for party supervision of, and state participation in, its activities. The Ministry of Defense was made up of the General Staff, the Main Political Directorate of the Soviet Armed Forces, the Warsaw Pact, the five armed services, and the main and central directorates. The General Staff was created by Stalin in 1935, as the development of more complex militaries required leaders with greater training and specialization. It acted as the main organ of control for all Soviet military forces during World War II. The five armed services were the navy, the ground forces, the military air forces, the air defense forces and the rocket forces. Higher level subunits in the Ministry would have an associated military collegium, essentially a council responsible for dealing with various issues, all under the ultimate command of the Central Committee of the Communist Party. Both the Ministry of Defense and the General Staff were predominantly led by the Ground Forces.

The minister of defense was always either a leading Communist Party civilian official or a Ground Forces general; the position was presumably filled on the recommendation of the Defense Council with the approval of the Politburo, although the Presidium of the Supreme Soviet made the formal announcement. After Minister of Defense General George Zhukov was removed from his position in the Politburo in 1957, the Minister of Defense would not be made a part of Politburo again until 1973. In the 1980s, the Minister of Defense would only maintain alternate membership in the Politburo. The three first deputy ministers of defense were the chief of the General Staff, the commander in chief of the Warsaw Pact, and another senior officer with unspecified duties. First deputy ministers of defense have also been selected from the Ground Forces. In 1989 the eleven deputy ministers of defense included the commanders in chief of the five armed services as well as the chiefs of Civil Defense, Rear Services, Construction and Troop Billeting, Armaments, the Main Personnel Directorate, and the Main Inspectorate.

Responsibilities
The Ministry of Defense directed the five armed services and all military activities on a daily basis. It was responsible for fielding, arming, and supplying the armed services, and in peacetime all territorial commands of the armed forces reported to it. The design, equipment and staffing of the military services, as well as the development of their individual doctrines was the responsibility of various deputies ministers, overseen by the General Staff. The Ministry of Defense has been staffed almost entirely by professional military personnel, and it has had a monopoly on military information because the Soviet Union has lacked independent defense research organizations frequently found in other countries. This monopoly has given high-ranking Soviet officers undisputed influence with party and government leaders on issues, ranging from arms control to weapons development to arms sales abroad, that affect the position and prestige of the armed forces. The Ministry of Defense was capable of calling on various Soviet academies and institutes for analysis and studies on military matters, as well as the each service's own academies capable of running field tests. Non-military institutes and personnel did not have access to this research.

The General Staff was responsible for overseeing war plans, training, mobilization and combat readiness of forces. During times of war, the General Staff would act as the executive arm of the Supreme High Command, exercising direct control over the five military forces. The top leadership of the Ministry of Defense (the Minister of Defense, the three first deputy ministers of defense, the eleven ministers of defense and the chief of the Main Political Directorate of the Soviet Army and Navy) formed the Main Military Council. At this time, the Main Military Council would become the headquarters of the Supreme High Command. The Main Military Council would also resolve conflicts between the five services and present the Defense Council with the budgetary requirements of the military determined by the General Staff.

See also
 Minister of Defense (Soviet Union)
Ministry of Defense Industry (Soviet Union)

References

Defense
Soviet Union